VALA – Libraries, Technology and the Future Inc. (VALA) is an Australian not-for-profit professional organisation that promotes the use and understanding of information and communication technologies across the galleries, libraries, archives and museum sectors.

History 

VALA was established as the Victorian Association for Library Automation in 1978 in response to the emergence of automated library catalogues and other technologies that were revolutionising the industry at the time. In 2006 VALA's name was changed to VALA – Libraries, Technology and the Future. In recent years VALA has signed separate memorandum of understanding (MoU) between the Australian Library and Information Association (ALIA) and the New Zealand Library Association LIANZA to foster cooperation and to better coordinate the respective organisation's activities.

Governance and membership 

VALA is governed by a Committee elected annually from the VALA membership. Membership is open to anyone interested in the professional aims of the organisation.

Conferences 

The VALA biennial conference is one of the largest conferences of its type in the region. Commencing in 1981, VALA conferences have provided one of the major points of contact for Australian librarians with their overseas counterparts.

Since 2010 VALA conferences have been held in the Melbourne Convention and Exhibition Centre.

Professional development events 
VALA holds a series of face-to-face and online professional development events throughout the year. The topics of the meetings support and promote an understanding of technology within the libraries and broader information sector. Where possible, free podcasts of these meetings are available on the VALA web site.

Awards 

VALA aims to further support research in and around the library information science sector through the provision of a series of awards

VALA grants the following awards:

 The Robert D. Williamson Award – Awarded biennially to an individual or organisation who, in the opinion of the judging panel, is currently making an outstanding contribution to the development of information technology usage in Australian libraries and is positively and significantly influencing development in information technology usage within libraries.
 The VALA Award – made biennially, is presented to the Australian library or information centre judged to have made the most innovative use of information technology during the previous two years.
 The VALA Travel Scholarship – every two years VALA offers up to two Travel Scholarships to enable suitable persons to travel overseas to examine aspects of library automation. Recipients receive up to A$13,000 towards travel, accommodation and living expenses. Successful candidates must complete their study in time to present their findings at the following VALA Biennial Conference.
 The VALA Student Award - Each year, the VALA Student Award is presented to one student from RMIT University and one from Monash University, in recognition of outstanding achievement in postgraduate library and information management courses.

References

External links 
 
 VALA's archived website on Australia's PANDORA web archive platform.

Library automation
Library associations
Non-profit organisations based in Victoria (Australia)
Technology conferences
Organizations established in 1978
1978 establishments in Australia